Judith Pella is an author of Christian fiction. Many of her books are historical in nature and involve extensive research.

Background 

Pella earned a Bachelor of Arts degree in Social Science, and worked as a registered nurse. Pella also worked as an instructional teacher’s aide for many years. She has frequently collaborated with writers Michael Phillips and Tracie Peterson. Tracie Peterson cited Pella as an influence in her writing.

Works 

 The Journals of Corrie Belle Hollister series (written with Michael Phillips)
 My Father's World
 Daughter of Grace, 
 On the Trail of the Truth, 1991
 A Place in the Sun
 Sea to Shining Sea, 1992, 
 Into the Long Dark Night, 1992, 
 Land of the Brave and the Free, 1993, 
 Home for the Heart, 1994, 

 Lone Star Legacy (published by Bethany House)
 Frontier Lady, 1993
 Stoner's Crossing, 1994
 Warrior's Song, 1996

 Stonewycke Trilogy (written with Michael Phillips and published by Bethany House)
 The Heather Hills of Stonewycke, 1993
 Flight From Stonewycke, 1994
 Lady of Stonewycke

This series was republished as a 3-in-1 book in 2000.

 Stonewycke Legacy (written with Michael Phillips and published by Bethany House)

 Shadows over Stonewycke, 1995
 Stranger at Stonewycke, 1995
 Treasure of Stonewycke, 1995

This is a continuation to the Stonewycke Trilogy. It was republished as a 3-in-1 book in 2000.

 Ribbons of Steel series (written with Tracie Peterson and published by Bethany House)
 Distant Dreams, 1997
 A Hope Beyond, 1997
 A Promise for Tomorrow, 1998

 Ribbons West series (written with Tracie Peterson and published by Bethany House)
 Westward the Dream, 1999
 Separate Roads, 1999
 Ties that Bind, 2000

This is a continuation to the Ribbons of Steel series.

 Texas Angel/Heaven's Road set (published by Bethany House)
 Texas Angel, 1999
 Heaven's Road, 2000

 The Russians series (written with Michael Phillips and published by Bethany House)
 The Crown and the Crucible, 1991
 A House Divided, 1992
 Travail and Triumph, 1992
 Heirs of the Motherland, 1993
 Dawning of Deliverance, 1995
 White Nights, Red Morning, 1996
 Passage Into Light, 1998

 Daughters of Fortune series (published by Bethany House)
 Written on the Wind, 2002
 Somewhere a Song, 2002
 Toward the Sunrise, 2003
 Homeward My Heart, 2004

This also was available in a box set in 2004.

 Patchwork Circle series (published by Bethany House)
 Bachelor's Puzzle, 2007
 Sister's Choice, 2008

 Standalone books
Blind Faith, published by Bethany House - part of the Portraits series, 1996
Mark of the Cross, published by Bethany House, 2006
Beloved Stranger, published by Bethany House, 1998

Personal life 
She and her husband live in Scappoose, Oregon.

References 

Christian writers
Living people
20th-century American novelists
21st-century American novelists
American women novelists
American historical novelists
Novelists from Oregon
People from Scappoose, Oregon
20th-century American women writers
21st-century American women writers
Women historical novelists
Year of birth missing (living people)